Cullman is the largest city and county seat of Cullman County, Alabama, United States. As of the 2010 census it had a population of 14,775, with an estimated population of 18,213 in 2020.

History
Before European colonization, the area that today includes Cullman was originally in the territory of the Cherokee Nation. The region was traversed by a trail known as the Black Warrior's Path, which led from the Tennessee River near the present location of Florence, Alabama, to a point on the Black Warrior River south of Cullman. This trail figured significantly in Cherokee history, and it featured prominently in the American Indian Wars prior to the establishment of the state of Alabama and the relocation of several American Indian tribes, including the Creek people westward along the Trail of Tears. During the Creek War in 1813, General Andrew Jackson of the U.S. Army dispatched a contingent of troops down the trail, one of which included the frontiersman Davy Crockett.

In the 1820s and the 1830s, two toll roads were built linking the Tennessee Valley to present-day Birmingham. In 1822, Abraham Stout was given a charter by the Alabama Legislature to open and turnpike a road beginning from Gandy's Cove in Morgan County to the ghost town of Baltimore on the Mulberry Fork near Colony. The road passed near present-day Vinemont through Cullman, Good Hope, and down the current Interstate 65 corridor to the Mulberry Fork. The road was later extended to Elyton (Birmingham) in 1827. It then became known as Stout's Road. Mace Thomas Payne Brindley was given a charter in 1833 to turnpike two roads, one running between Blount Springs to Somerville by way of his homestead in present-day Simcoe, and the second road passing west of Hanceville and east of Downtown Cullman to join Stout's Road north of the city. What later became the Brindley Turnpike became an extension of Stout's Road to Decatur. Cullman later became located between the juncture of the two roads, and they predated the corridor of U.S. Route 31.

During the Civil War, the future location of Cullman was the site of the minor Battle of Day's Gap. On April 30, 1863, Union forces under the command of Colonel Abel Streight won a victory over forces under Confederate General Nathan Bedford Forrest. This battle was part of a campaign and chase known collectively as Streight's Raid. Although Streight got the upper hand in this battle, Forrest would have the last laugh. In one of the more humorous moments of the war, Streight sought a truce and negotiations with Forrest in present-day Cherokee County near present-day Gaylesville. Although Streight's force was larger than Forrest's, while the two were negotiating, Forrest had his troops march repeatedly in a circuitous route past the site of the talks. Thinking himself to be badly outnumbered, Streight surrendered to Forrest.

Cullman itself was founded in 1873 by Colonel John G. Cullmann, a German immigrant. Cullmann had been an advocate of democratic reforms in his native Bavaria, having fought and acquired his honorific title "Colonel" during the Revolutions of 1848–49. After the failure of the revolution, Cullmann found himself in financial ruin. In the years to follow, he would try to re-establish himself in business, but after several setbacks, including a great financial loss in the First Schleswig War, he would remain unsuccessful. As time went on and Prussia, under King Wilhelm I and his Minister President Otto von Bismarck, began to exert more influence in the German region (eventually unifying Germany under Prussian rule in 1871), Cullmann began to believe that his political ideals were fundamentally incompatible with those of the German Government. As a result, he decided to emigrate from his homeland. Settling first in London due to fears that he would be forced to join in the ongoing American Civil War, Cullman eventually came to America in 1865. He moved to Alabama in 1871 and, in 1873, negotiated an agreement to act as agent for a tract of land  in size, owned by the Louisville and Nashville Railroad Company, on which he established a colony for German immigrants.

Five German families moved to the area in March 1873; in 1874, the town was incorporated and named after Colonel Cullmann (with the town name being Americanized to 'Cullman' with one 'n'). Over the next 20 years, Cullmann encouraged around 100,000 Germans to immigrate to the United States, with many settling in the Cullman area. Cullmann drew on his military engineering training in laying out and planning the town. During this period, Cullman underwent considerable growth. German continued to be widely spoken, and Cullmann himself was the publisher of a German-language newspaper. When Cullmann died in 1895, at the age of 72, his funeral was marked by the attendance of Governor William C. Oates. The site Cullmann selected for his headquarters is now his gravesite.

German immigrants also founded St. Bernard's Monastery, on the grounds of which is the Ave Maria Grotto, containing 125 miniature reproductions of some of the most famous religious structures of the world. It is Cullman's principal tourist attraction.

From the 1890s up until the 1970s, Cullman was reported to be a sundown town, where African Americans were not allowed to live. The Ku Klux Klan would maintain a presence in the county throughout the civil rights movement, erecting signs that deterred African Americans from being within the county at night. This subsequently led to a rise in population of Colony, Alabama which was a safe haven for the discriminated.

For many years Cullman was a college town, with Saint Bernard College serving as the home of several hundred students. In the mid-1970s, St. Bernard briefly merged with Sacred Heart College (a two-year Benedictine women's college), to become Southern Benedictine College. That college closed in 1979, and it now operates as St. Bernard Preparatory School, serving grades 9-12. The former site of Sacred Heart College is now the Sacred Heart Monastery, which serves as a retreat center operated by the Benedictine Sisters of Sacred Heart Monastery.

During the 20th century, Cullman developed a more diverse economy, including several manufacturing and distribution facilities. The City of Cullman regularly ranks as a top 'micropolitan' city in the nation.

Cullman gained national attention in early 2008, when a special election was held to fill a vacancy in the Alabama House of Representatives. The district that included Cullman elected James C. Fields, an African-American, in that special election.

Cullman's German heritage was repressed during World War I and World War II, while the United States was fighting Germany. This was reversed in the 1970s, with renewed interest in the city's history and heritage. Today, Cullman holds an annual Oktoberfest. An honorary "Bürgermeister" is elected for each Oktoberfest. For many years the Oktoberfest did not include alcohol because Cullman was dry, but starting in 2011 the Oktoberfest was able to offer beer.

Geography
Cullman is located on top of the Brindley Mountain plateau at  (34.177508, −86.844996). This is a close offshoot of the long geographic ridge called Sand Mountain, a southmost extension of the Appalachian Mountains. Cullman provides its own town water supply from a city-owned lake within the city limits, Lake Catoma.

New zoning laws and alcohol ordinances have allowed for greater expansion and growth in the downtown Cullman area.

Climate
The climate in this area is characterized by hot, humid summers and generally mild to cool winters.  According to the Köppen Climate Classification system, Cullman has a humid subtropical climate, abbreviated "Cfa" on climate maps.

Severe weather

Downtown was significantly damaged by an EF4 tornado during the 2011 Super Outbreak. Hitting on April 27, it destroyed many buildings in downtown and in an east-side residential area, but causing no fatalities. The twister moved northeast towards Arab and Guntersville, killing two Cullman County residents and at least four others. Cullman has since rebuilt and revitalized the downtown area.

Education
The Cullman City School System operates five schools:

Cullman Primary School (Pre-K – First Grade)
East Elementary (Second Grade – Sixth Grade)
West Elementary (Second Grade – Sixth Grade)
John G. Cullman Middle School (Seventh and Eighth Grades)
Cullman High School (Ninth Grade – Twelfth Grade)

Other schools in Cullman include:

Saint Bernard Preparatory School,  Benedictine boarding and day school (Ninth grade – Twelfth grade)
Saint Bernard Middle School (Seventh and Eighth Grade)
Sacred Heart Elementary School (Pre-K – Sixth Grade)
Saint Paul's Lutheran School (Pre-K – Sixth Grade)
Cullman Christian School (Pre-K – Twelfth Grade)

Cullman is also the home of  Wallace State Community College in Hanceville. It was named for the former Governor of Alabama, George C. Wallace.  The public, non-profit college opened its doors in 1966 and has grown to become the third largest community college in the state of Alabama, with an enrollment of around 6,000 students.

Demographics

2020 census

As of the 2020 United States census, there were 18,213 people, 6,096 households, and 4,015 families residing in the city.

2010 census
The racial makeup of the city was 95% White, 0.8% Black or African American, 0.5% Native American, 0.6% Asian, 0.0% Pacific Islander, and 1.6% from two or more races. 6.8% of the population were Hispanic or Latino of any race.

As of the census of 2010, there were 14,775 people and 6,957 households, out of which 22.5% had children under the age of 18 living with them, 48.3% were married couples living together, 10.7% had a female householder with no husband present, and 37.9% were non-families. 35.2% of all households were made up of individuals, and 18.0% had someone living alone who was 65 years of age or older. The average household size was 2.22 and the average family size was 2.85.

In the city, the population was spread out, with 21.8% under the age of 18, 8.2% from 18 to 24, 25.3% from 25 to 44, 22.6% from 45 to 64, and 22.1% who were 65 years of age or older. The median age was 41 years. For every 100 females, there were 87.5 males. For every 100 females age 18 and over, there were 81.4 males.

The median income for a household in the city was $29,164, and the median income for a family was $41,313. Males had a median income of $32,863 versus $21,647 for females. The per capita income for the city was $18,484. About 9.4% of families and 13.2% of the population were below the poverty line, including 12.3% of those under age 18 and 18.5% of those age 65 or over.

Cullman was ranked among Bloomberg Businessweek's 50 Best Places to Raise Your Kids in 2012 based on the city's educational and economic factors, crime level, air quality, amenities, and ethnic diversity.

Media

Radio stations
WFMH 1340 AM (Sports/Talk)
WKUL 92.1 FM (Country/Talk)
 WRJM-LP 95.5 FM  (CHR/AAA/Variety)
WMCJ 1460 AM (Southern Gospel)
WXJC-FM 101.1 FM (Gospel/Talk)

Newspapers
The Cullman Times (daily)
The Cullman Tribune (daily)

Television
Cullman is in the TV broadcasting areas of Birmingham and Huntsville, Alabama.

There are two low-power broadcasting stations in Cullman: WCQT-LD TV-27 and CATV-2. Cullman also has a PEG station, CCTV55, which is run by students at Cullman High School. CCTV55 was known as CATS-55 at one time.

Health care
 Cullman Regional Medical Center – a 115-bed hospital

Transportation
 Interstate 65
 U.S. Highway 31
 U.S. Highway 278
 State Route 69
 State Route 157
CSX Transportation (railroad)
Folsom Field municipal airport

Notable people
JoJo Billingsley, singer/songwriter
Wesley Britt, NFL Offensive Tackle for the New England Patriots
Paul Burnum, former basketball and baseball coach at the University of Alabama
Paul Bussman, member of the Alabama Senate
Christina Chambers, WBRC-TV Sports Reporter, former Cullman High School and UAB track athlete.
Caleb Clay, former pitcher for the Los Angeles Angels of Anaheim
Melinda Dillon, actress, A Christmas Story  
Jamelle Folsom, First Lady of Alabama 1948 – 1951 and 1955 – 1959
James E. "Big Jim" Folsom, Governor of Alabama 1947 – 1951 and 1955 – 1959
James E. "Little Jim" Folsom Jr., Governor of Alabama 1993 – 1995, Lieutenant Governor of Alabama 1987-1993 and 2007-2011
Morgan Smith Goodwin, actress, 2012 - 2013 Wendy's spokesperson
Roger Hallmark, country musician
Kurt Heinecke, composer and voice actor; known for his work on the children's program Veggie Tales
Charles Kleibacker, fashion designer
Jordan Lee, bass fisherman, 2x winner of the Bassmaster Classic 
Harold E. Martin, journalist and 1970 Pulitzer Prize winner
William C. Martin, physicist
Julian L. McPhillips, candidate for Attorney General of Alabama in 1978
David Miller, American football defensive end 
Kassie Miller, singer/songwriter
Talmadge Prince, stock car racing driver who was killed in a crash in a qualifying race for the 1970 Daytona 500
Josh Rutledge, MLB player
Shallow Side, rock music band formed in 2011
Frank Stitt, James Beard Award-winning chef 
Channing Tatum, actor/model
Keegan Thompson is an American professional baseball pitcher for the Chicago Cubs of MLB
Wayne Trimble, American football player
Zac Tubbs, American football offensive lineman
Holly Williams, country music singer, daughter of Hank Williams Jr.
Larry Willingham, professional football player

References

External links

City of Cullman official website

Cities in Alabama
Cities in Cullman County, Alabama
County seats in Alabama
Populated places established in 1873
Sundown towns in Alabama
1873 establishments in Alabama